Coniesta is a genus of moths of the family Crambidae.

Species
Coniesta araealis (Hampson, 1912)
Coniesta forsteri (Bleszynski, 1965)
Coniesta ignefusalis (Hampson, 1919)
Coniesta williami (de Joannis, 1927)

References

Haimbachiini
Crambidae genera
Taxa named by George Hampson